The 2019 Men's NORCECA Volleyball Championship was the 26th edition of the tournament, and was held in Winnipeg, Canada from 2 to 7 September 2019. Top three teams which had not yet qualified to the 2020 Summer Olympics or the 2020 North American Olympic Qualification Tournament qualified for the 2020 North American Olympic Qualification Tournament.

Qualification
The hosts Canada and the top seven ranked teams from the NORCECA Ranking as of 1 January 2019 qualified for the tournament. But, Suriname replaced Trinidad and Tobago, who withdrew from the tournament. And, Suriname withdrew just before the beginning of the tournament. Rankings are shown in brackets except the hosts who ranked 2nd.

 (Hosts)
 (1)
 (3)
 (4)
 (5)
 (6)
 (7)
 (8)
 (13)

Pools composition
Teams were seeded following the serpentine system according to their NORCECA Ranking as of 1 January 2019. NORCECA reserved the right to seed the hosts as head of pool A regardless of the NORCECA Ranking.

Squads

Venue
 Duckworth Centre, Winnipeg, Canada

Pool standing procedure
 Number of matches won
 Match points
 Points ratio
 Sets ratio
 Result of the last match between the tied teams

Match won 3–0: 5 match points for the winner, 0 match points for the loser
Match won 3–1: 4 match points for the winner, 1 match point for the loser
Match won 3–2: 3 match points for the winner, 2 match points for the loser

Preliminary round
All times are Central Daylight Time (UTC−05:00).

Pool A

Pool B

Final round
All times are Central Daylight Time (UTC−05:00).

Quarterfinals

5th place match

Semifinals

6th place match

3rd place match

Final

Final standing

Awards

Most Valuable Player
 Miguel Ángel López
Best Scorer
 Henry Tapia
Best Server
 Osniel Melgarejo
Best Digger
 Kyle Dagostino
Best Receiver
 Jesús Rangel
Best Setter
 Luis Garcìa
Best Outside Spikers
 Torey DeFalco
 Stephen Maar
Best Middle Blockers
 Roamy Alonso
 Jeffrey Jendryk
Best Opposite Spiker
 Maurice Torres
Best Libero
 Kyle Dagostino

See also
2019 Women's NORCECA Volleyball Championship

References

External links
Official website
Regulations
Awards

Men's NORCECA Volleyball Championship
NORCECA
2019 in American sports
International volleyball competitions hosted by Canada
2019 in Canadian sports
NORCECA